Matelot is a loanword from Middle French, meaning a sailor or seaman.

Matelot may also refer to:
Matelot, Trinidad and Tobago
Matelot (novel), by Pierre Loti
"Matelot", a song by Noël Coward from the 1945 musical Sigh No More

See also
Matlow (disambiguation)